Metonga Lake is a lake located in Forest County, Wisconsin. Metonga Lake is a drainage lake with a mostly sand and gravel bottom. The city of Crandon is located on the northern shore of the lake. The Crandon Municipal Airport lies on the southwestern shore.

See also
List of lakes of Wisconsin

References

Lakes of Forest County, Wisconsin